Six-Bid Solo, Six Bid Solo or just Six-Bid for short, is a trick-taking, card game from the western United States for 3 players and is often associated with Salt Lake City. It is a member of the German Tarok group of games that originated in an attempt to play a tarot card game with standard, non-tarot cards. Six Bid Solo itself is a variant of Frog, a game very similar to south German Tapp, the Swabian version of German Tarok.

History 
The origins of Six-Bid Solo lie with an old south German game called German Tarok (Deutschtarok) which arose in the desire to play the tarot card game of Grosstarock with German-suited, non-tarot cards. German Tarok appeared in the late 18th century and became very popular in Württemberg, Swabia and Bavaria during the 19th century. One offshoot was the game of Tapp, played in Württemberg and Swabia, which was essentially German Tarok with French-suited cards. It may have been Tapp that was brought to the United States by European emigrants and which became the game of Frog, the name being derived from the lowest contract in Tapp, which was a Frage or Froag. The rules of Frog first appeared in a 1907 Hoyle and, by 1922, a variant called Straight Solo had emerged in which the Frog contract had been dropped. This mirrored a practice in German Tarok where the Frage contract was left out in many places, something that was "regrettable" because there was much skill involved in playing it. Six-Bid was an elaboration of Straight Solo from two to six contracts, very like the modern version of Tapp with its contracts to lose or win every trick and in which hearts is a preference suit. The rules for Six-Bid Solo first appeared in the 1924 edition of Hoyles Standard Games (HSG) and have hardly changed since. It was played in Salt Lake City and is sometimes referred to as Salt Lake Solo. The 1940 Official Rules note it as "A Salt Lake Variation" without further elaboration. It is also known as American Solo.

Rules 
The following rules are based on HSG supplemented by the other sources cited.

Players 
Six Bid may be played by three or four, but there are always only three active players; if four play the dealer is 'king' and sits out. Some rules state that five<ref name=GH>Goren (1961), pp. 328–329</ref> or even seven may play but, again, only  three are active in any one deal.Goren (1961), p. 327.

 Cards 
Thirty six French-suited cards are used, formed by stripping the 2s, 3s, 4s and 5s from a standard 52-card pack. The cards rank and score, as in most Ace-Ten games, as follows:

 Deal and auction 
Deal and play are clockwise. The first dealer is chosen by any desired method. The dealer shuffles and has the cards cut before dealing a packet of 4 cards to each player, beginning with eldest hand, then 3 each, then 3 cards face down on the table as the widow, and finally 4 more cards each, i.e. 4-3-(3)-4, so that each player has a hand of 11 cards. If four play, the dealer now sits out and does not participate in the game.

Beginning with eldest, players may pass or bid for one of the six games listed below. Players may not change their announced bid unless overcalled in which case they must immediately raise or pass. The winner of the auction becomes the 'bidder' or 'player' and the widow counts to him or her at the end, except in Misère. The games are shown below in ascending order:

Some rules rename Guarantee Solo andSpread Misère to Guarantee and Spread respectively. In a Spread Misère, the bidder's hand is laid down, face up, after the other two players have played their first card. In a Call Solo, if the called card is sleeping in the widow, there is no exchange.

 Play 
Except in Spread, eldest leads any card to the first trick and play proceeds clockwise, each player playing one card. Players must follow suit if able; otherwise must trump if able. If they can neither follow nor trump they may discard. There is no requirement to head the trick. The trick winner collects the trick and lays it away face down before leading to the next trick.

 Scoring 
Scoring is as per the table above. If the game is won, the bidder is paid the game value by each active opponent; if lost, the bidder pays the same to each player at the table including the dealer if there are four players.

 Progressive Solo 
Another variant of Frog that emerged at the same time as Six-Bid was Progressive Solo, later also called Denver Progressive Solo or Denver Solo. The 1940 Official Rules subtitle Progressive Solo as the "Denver Athletic Club Variation" without substantiating the statement. Its rules were last recorded in the 1980s so it may now be extinct. Pennycook describes it as a "simple, yet skilful, game." The rules are as for Six-Bid, except where stated.

Three to five may play. This time there are five contracts. Players bid in rotation and must initially pass or bid any contract. Once a bid is made, subsequent players must pass, double or overcall. A player whose bid is overcalled may double or raise when the bidding comes around again, otherwise must pass. Any doubling is only between the bidder and the doubler and is cancelled if the current contract is overcalled. A player who has been doubled may redouble when the turn comes around again. Once all bar one have passed, the player left in becomes the 'bidder' and must play the highest contract announced. In a Frog, the bidder picks up and exchanges with the widow before laying away the three discards, face down, to one side. In any solo, the widow is untouched. In either case, the widow cards count towards the bidder's score at the end of play.

To win, the bidder must then take at least 60 card points in tricks and the widow. If successful, the bidder is paid by each opponent for each point above 60; if unsuccessful, the bidder pays them each the same amount. The tariffs, which are multiplied by any doubling or redoubling, are shown in the summary table below:

In addition, there may be two pots – one for Frog and one for the Solos – to which players ante an agreed amount each deal. Pennycook specifies the same stake for each pot; HSG states that the solo pot receives a double stake from each player.

 Footnotes 

 
 References 

 Literature 
 _ (1839). Das Sansprendre-Spiel in Regeln zur richtigen Auffassung und Ausführung desselben nach seinen verschiedenen Nuancen dargestellt (SSR). Bayreuth: Grau 50 pp.
 _ (1881). Ausführliche Anleitung zum Deutschtarokspielen, nebst einem Anhange, enthaltend: ein Verzeichniß über alle technischen oder Kunstausdrücke, Provinzialismen und vulgären Bezeichnungen, welche bei diesem Spiele vorkommen. (AAD) Munich: Cäsar Fritsch. 88 pp.
 _ (1907). Hoyle's Games. NY: McClure.
 _ (1922). Official Rules of Card Games. Cincinnati: USPC.
 _ (1924). Hoyle's Standard Games. Cincinnati: USPC.
 _ (1940). Official Rules of Card Games: Hoyle Up to Date.  Cincinnati: USPC.
 Beattie, Rob (2009). The Art of Playing Cards. NY: Quarto. 
 Culbertson, Ely (1957), Phillips, Hubert (ed.), Culbertson’s Card Games Complete, Watford: Argo
 Dummett, Michael (1980). The Game of Tarot. London: Duckworth. 
 Gibson, Walter B. (1993) [1974]. Hoyle's Modern Encyclopedia of Card Games. Devizes: Selecta.
 Goren, Charles (1961). Goren's Hoyle - Encyclopedia of Games. NY: Chancellor Hall, Ltd.
 Morehead, Albert H, Richard L. Frey and Geoffrey Mott-Smith (1991). The New Complete Hoyle NY, London: Doubleday.
 Parlett, David (1991), A History of Card Games, Oxford: OUP.
 Parlett, David (2008), The Penguin Book of Card Games, London: Penguin, 
 Pennycook, Andrew (1982). The Book of Card Games.'' London/NY: Grenada. 

German Tarok group
Three-player card games
American card games
French deck card games